Saint-Bernard-de-Michaudville is a municipality in southwestern Quebec, Canada in the Regional County Municipality of Les Maskoutains. The population as of the Canada 2021 Census was 616. The community was officially renamed from the Parish of Saint-Bernard-Partie-Sud to the Municipality of Saint-Bernard-de-Michaudville on July 19, 1997.

Demographics

Population

Language

See also
List of municipalities in Quebec

References

External links

Municipalities in Quebec
Incorporated places in Les Maskoutains Regional County Municipality